A solar powered radio is a portable radio receiver powered by photovoltaic panels. It is primarily used in remote areas where access to power sources is limited.

History 
The solar powered radio first came into existence in the 1950s. An experimental model, developed by General Electric, weighed just 10 ounces and was capable of working without light and recharging. It contained seven solar cells, four transistors and a small battery. In 1954, Western Electric began to sell commercial licenses solar powered radio, including other photovoltaic technologies. In 1957 the Acopian Technical Co. of Pohatcong Township, New Jersey, was reported as manufacturing the first solar radios for commercial sale to the general public.

Advantages 
Solar powered radios eliminate the need to replace batteries, which makes operating them cost much less. Since they don't require plugs, they can be used in areas where there is no electrical grid or generators.  As a result, people in remote areas with little disposable income can have equal access to news and information. Informative radio programs, combined with solar powered radios, can be a powerful tool for improving the lives of people in remote areas.

References

See also 

 Batteryless radio
 Windup radio

Applications of photovoltaics